Gephyra getusalis is a species of snout moth in the genus Gephyra. It was described by Francis Walker in 1859 and is known from Brazil.

References

Moths described in 1859
Chrysauginae